George Barr Waddell (29 November 1888 – 17 September 1966) was a Scottish professional footballer who played in the Scottish Football League for Rangers and in the Football League in England for Bradford City, Preston North End, Oldham Athletic, Birmingham and New Brighton. He played as a wing half.

Waddell was born in Lesmahagow, Lanarkshire. He began his football career in junior football before joining Rangers in 1909. He made his debut in Division One on 26 April 1909 in a 3–2 defeat to Queen's Park. Over the next four seasons he played 21 league games for Rangers, and spent time on loan at Kilmarnock. In June 1914, Bradford City paid £1,000 for Waddell's services. He played 23 First Division games either side of the First World War before joining Preston North End for a fee of £1,750 in September 1920. After two seasons and 51 First Division games he had brief spells with a succession of clubs: Oldham Athletic, who paid £250 for his services, Birmingham for £325, to Scotland with Hamilton Academical, back to England with New Brighton, and then Wolverhampton Wanderers, but without appearing for their league side. Waddell then had various player-coach roles, with Aberaman Athletic, Chorley and Fraserburgh, and had spells as reserve team coach and assistant trainer with former club Preston North End, and trainer with Dick, Kerr's Ladies, before finishing his football career with Ribble Motors.

Waddell died in Sible Hedingham, Essex, in 1966 at the age of 77.

Notes

References

1888 births
1966 deaths
People from Lesmahagow
Scottish footballers
Association football wing halves
Rangers F.C. players
Kilmarnock F.C. players
Bradford City A.F.C. players
Preston North End F.C. players
Oldham Athletic A.F.C. players
Birmingham City F.C. players
Hamilton Academical F.C. players
New Brighton A.F.C. players
Wolverhampton Wanderers F.C. players
Chorley F.C. players
Scottish Football League players
English Football League players
Aberaman Athletic F.C. players
Burnbank Athletic F.C. players
Scottish Junior Football Association players
Footballers from South Lanarkshire
Larkhall United F.C. players